Macabre Cadaver Magazine was an American online horror, fantasy and science fiction magazine. Macabre Cadaver published short fiction, poetry, and non-fiction articles. Macabre Cadaver Magazine was produced by Stark Raven Press and was available as an online webzine available in PDF and HTML format. Macabre Cadaver released only two print issues (#6 and #7) before placing print runs on indefinite hiatus on May 1, 2009. A final print issue (Spring 2011 Issue #10) was released before the online website was shuttered in May, 2011.

Staff
 Emmanuel Paige, Publisher/Executive editor
 Jeff Woodward, Editor
 Tammy Kane, Staff Writer/Reader
 Richard Worden, Reader

Former staff
 Angela Megl, Assistant to the editor
 Adam Blomquist, Staff Writer/Reader

Authors interviewed
Interviews with novelists and writers, conducted by the editor of Macabre Cadaver, were regularly featured in the magazine.  Noted authors interviewed included:
 John Saul
 Scott Nicholson
 Mort Castle
 Daniel P. Coughlin
 Andrea Dean Van Scoyoc

Actors interviewed
Interviews with actors, conducted by the editor of Macabre Cadaver, were regularly featured in the magazine.  Noted actors interviewed included:
 Debbie Rochon
 J. David Moeller
 Melissa Bacelar
 Tyler Mane
 Scarlet Salem

Musicians interviewed
Interviews with musicians and band members, conducted by the editor of Macabre Cadaver, were regularly featured in the magazine.  Noted musicians interviewed included:
 Otep
 The Creepshow
 Lady Parasyte
 John DeServio
 Chad Cherry of The Last Vegas
 Jason Hook of Five Finger Death Punch

Reviews
Reviews of books, movies, theater, and music by the editor of Macabre Cadaver, were regularly featured in the magazine.  Noted reviews included:
 WildClaw Theatre Company
 Just After Sunset by Stephen King

Cover art
Issue 7 of Macabre Cadaver featured cover art by Clint Carney, an artist known for his violent art and also as a member of the electro-industrial music group System Syn.

ISSN 

See also
Horror fiction magazine
List of literary magazines

Notes and references

External links
 
 Stark Raven Press website

Defunct science fiction magazines published in the United States
Fantasy fiction magazines
Horror fiction magazines
Magazines established in 2008
Magazines disestablished in 2011
Quarterly magazines published in the United States